Charles Kingsley Adams, CBE, FBA (17 June 1899 – 19 January 1971) was director, Keeper and Secretary of the National Portrait Gallery from 1951 to 1964

Adams was born in Sidcup, Kent on 17 June 1899, the son of Albert and Annie Adams, his father was a watchmaker.  He was commissioned as a 2nd Lieutenant in the East Surrey Regiment during the First World War. 
 
He was made CBE in 1954 and was a Fellow of the Society of Antiquaries. His portrait is held by the NPG

Adams died in London on 19 January 1971.

References

1899 births
1971 deaths
Commanders of the Order of the British Empire
Fellows of the Society of Antiquaries of London
Directors of the National Portrait Gallery, London
People from Sidcup
East Surrey Regiment officers
20th-century British businesspeople